Im Jae-yeon (born 6 September 1991) is a South Korean road and track cyclist, who currently rides for UCI Continental team . He won the bronze medal in the team pursuit at the 2016 Asian Cycling Championships.

References

External links

 

1991 births
Living people
South Korean track cyclists
South Korean male cyclists
Place of birth missing (living people)
Cyclists at the 2014 Asian Games
Asian Games medalists in cycling
Medalists at the 2014 Asian Games
Asian Games silver medalists for South Korea
Cyclists at the 2018 Asian Games
Universiade bronze medalists for South Korea
Universiade medalists in cycling
20th-century South Korean people
21st-century South Korean people